Mansuriyeh (also Romanized as Manşūrīyeh; also known as Qal‘eh-ye Manşūrīā) is a village in Harirud Rural District, Bujgan District, Torbat-e Jam County, Razavi Khorasan Province, Iran. At the 2006 census, its population was 449, in 101 families.

References 

Populated places in Torbat-e Jam County